Robert Henry "Bob" Pettit (July 19, 1861 in Williamstown, Massachusetts – November 1, 1910 in Derby, Connecticut), was a professional baseball player who played pitcher and outfielder in the Major Leagues from 1887 to 1891. He played for the Chicago White Stockings and Milwaukee Brewers.

See also
 List of Major League Baseball annual saves leaders

External links

1861 births
1910 deaths
Major League Baseball pitchers
Baseball players from Massachusetts
19th-century baseball players
Milwaukee Brewers (AA) players
Chicago White Stockings players
Meriden (minor league baseball) players
Waterbury (minor league baseball) players
Hartford Babies players
Waterbury Brassmen players
Wilkes-Barre Coal Barons players
Waterbury Brass Citys players
Wilkes-Barre Barons (baseball) players
Toronto Canucks players
Milwaukee Brewers (minor league) players
Milwaukee Creams players
New Haven (minor league baseball) players
Providence Grays (minor league) players
Providence Clamdiggers (baseball) players
Hartford Bluebirds players
Meriden Bulldogs players
Waterbury Indians players